Operación Triunfo is a Spanish reality television music competition to find new singing talent. The ninth series, also known as Operación Triunfo 2017, aired on La 1 from 23 October 2017 to 5 February 2018, presented by Roberto Leal. It was the first season broadcast by RTVE, which aired the first three seasons, in thirteen years. Seasons 4–8 of Operación Triunfo aired on Telecinco, which discontinued the series in 2011 due to declining ratings. RTVE approved to revive the series with a budget of 10.2 million euros.

In addition to the Galas or weekly live shows on La 1, daily recap shows aired on Clan, and the side show El Chat aired on La 1 after each weekly Gala, hosted by Noemí Galera. The activities of the contestants at "The Academy" or La Academia were streamed live via YouTube and the subscription platform Sky España.

Amaia Romero was announced the winner on 5 February 2018. Aitana Ocaña came second. Miriam Rodríguez ranked third, Alfred García fourth and fifth place went to Ana Guerra.

On 4 December 2017, during sixth week's live show or "Gala 6", it was announced that the series would serve as the platform to select the Spanish entrant at the Eurovision Song Contest 2018. On 20 December 2017, TVE announced that the five contestants that would succeed in advancing to the series' final would also be the five candidates to represent Spain at Eurovision. The live show that selected the Spanish entrant and song for Eurovision took place on 29 January 2018. Alfred García and Amaia Romero were selected with the song "Tu canción".

The ninth series turned into a media success in Spain, which was compared to the success of the original series of Operación Triunfo sixteen years before. Some of the contestants from this series such as Amaia Romero, Alfred García, Aitana, Miriam Rodríguez, Ana Guerra, Cepeda, Agoney, Mimi Doblas, Roi Méndez, Raoul Vázquez or Mireya Bravo went on to launch solo projects.

Headmaster, judges and presenter
On 18 July 2017, Noemí Galera, who had appeared as a member of the jury panel on previous seasons, was announced as the new "headmaster" of the Academy. On 28 August 2017, it was revealed that the jury panel would consist of three regular judges and a fourth guest judge. The three regular judges were singer, songwriter and producer Mónica Naranjo, marketing director Joe Pérez-Orive and music executive and producer Manuel Martos, who were accompanied every week by a guest panelist from the music industry. On 30 August 2017, it was announced that Roberto Leal would debut as host of Operación Triunfo.

Auditions
Open casting auditions began on 14 June 2017 in Barcelona and concluded on 18 July 2017 in Madrid. The minimum age to audition was 18.

After the open auditions, 81 candidates were called for a closed-door audition on 20 and 21 September 2017. 18 candidates advanced to the introduction live show or Gala 0, where the 16 official contestants who entered the Academy were selected.

Contestants
The 18 contestants that would appear on the introduction live show or Gala 0 were announced on 20 October 2017.

Galas
The Galas or live shows began on 23 October 2017. In the introduction live show or Gala 0, 18 candidates were presented to enter the "Academy." Each contestant performed a cover version of a popular song of their choice, and two of the candidates were eliminated. For the regular galas, the contestants are assigned a popular song to perform in a duet or solo. The audience votes for their favourite performer, and the contestant with the most votes is exempt for nominations. The jury panel comments on the performances and nominates four contestants for eviction. The Academy's staff meeting saves one of the nominees, and the safe contestants save another of the nominees. The two remaining nominees prepare the performance of a song of their choice each for next week's live show, where one of the contestants will be saved by the audience via televote, sms and app voting. Each gala features a guest judge and guest performers.

Results summary
Colour key

Gala 0 (23 October 2017)
Musical guests:
Mónica Naranjo ("Solo se vive una vez")
Rosa López ("Ahora sé quién soy")

Gala 1 (30 October 2017)
Musical guest: Becky G ("Mayores")
Guest judge: David Bustamante

Gala 2 (6 November 2017)
Group performance: "Te quiero"
Musical guest: Morat ("Yo contigo, tú conmigo") (with Cepeda)
Guest judge: Wally López

Gala 3 (13 November 2017)
Group performance: "I'm Still Standing"
Musical guests:
Blas Cantó ("In Your Bed")
India Martínez ("Aguasanta")
Guest judge: Julia Gómez Cora

Gala 4 (20 November 2017)
Group performance: "Eres tú"
Musical guests:
Ruth Lorenzo ("Good Girls Don't Lie")
Maldita Nerea ("Cuando todas las historias se acaban") (with Ana Guerra)
Guest judge: Alejandro Parreño

Gala 5 (27 November 2017)
Group performance: "La revolución sexual"
Musical guests:
Romeo Santos ("Imitadora")
Beatriz Luengo ("Más que suerte") (with Agoney)
Guest judge: Tony Aguilar

Gala 6 (4 December 2017)
Group performance: "Ain't No Mountain High Enough"
Musical guests:
Taburete ("Sirenas")
Pastora Soler ("La tormenta")
Guest judge: David Bustamante

Gala 7 (11 December 2017)
Group performance: "¿A quién le importa?"
Musical guests:
Lorena Gómez ("Vulnerable a ti")
Vanesa Martín ("Hábito de ti")
Guest judge: Sole Giménez

Gala 8 (18 December 2017)
Group performance: "Shake It Off"
Musical guests:
Sergio Dalma ("Este amor no se toca")
La Oreja de Van Gogh ("Estoy contigo")
Guest judge: Javier Llano

Gala 9 (2 January 2018)
Group performance: "Hoy puede ser un gran día"
Musical guest: Carlos Baute ("Vamo' a la calle")
Guest judge: Wally López

Gala 10 (8 January 2018)
From this week, voting for the favourite of the audience was put on hold for the final stretch of the series, and no contestant was exempt for nominations.
Group performance: "Resistiré"
Musical guest: Pablo López ("El patio")
Guest judge: Carlos Jean

Gala 11 (15 January 2018) 
This episode determined the first four contestants that qualified for the final. Each of the four members of the jury panel gave marks to the contestants (from 5 to 10). The three contestants with the highest score were saved. The Academy's staff saved a fourth contestant. The two remaining contestants were up for elimination.
Group performance: "País Tropical"
Musical guest: Abraham Mateo ("Loco Enamorado")
Guest judge: Julia Gómez Cora

Gala 12 (22 January 2018) 
Group performance: "Cuéntame"
Musical guests:
Rozalén ("La puerta violeta")
Sebastián Yatra ("Sutra")
Guest judge: Javier Llano

Gala Final (5 February 2018) 
In the final, the winner of the series was decided by public vote. Each finalist performed a popular song of their choice, and after that, the first round of voting ended. The two finalists with the fewest votes were eliminated. A second round of voting began to determine the winner of the series, and the three remaining finalists performed the song they had sung on "Gala 0".
Group performances:
"Mi gran noche" (with Raphael)
"Camina" (all sixteen contestants)
Musical guests:
Raphael ("Mi gran noche")
Pablo Alborán ("Prometo")
David Bisbal ("Mi princesa")
Guest judge: Rosa López

Specials

Gala de Navidad (25 December 2017)
On 25 December 2017 a Christmas special aired on La 1, where the sixteen official contestants of the series performed together with some of the contestants from the original series of Operación Triunfo.
Group performances:
"Mi música es tu voz"
"Camina"

Gala Eurovisión (29 January 2018) 
The five finalists performed original songs (written by music publishers and internally chosen by the Spanish broadcaster) with the goal of representing Spain at the Eurovision Song Contest 2018. Each finalist was allocated a song to be performed solo, three songs were allocated to duet combinations which included the sixth-placed contestant Agoney, and "Camina" was a candidate song performed by the five finalists. The Spanish entry for Eurovision was decided by public vote. After a first round of voting, the three entries with the most votes from the public advanced to a second round of voting. In the second round, the Spanish entry was selected by public vote.
Group performance: 
"La, la, la" (Cepeda, Juan Antonio, Mimi, Mireya and Thalía)
"Vivo cantando" (Marina, Nerea, Ricky, Raoul and Roi)
Musical guests: 
Luísa Sobral ("Cupido")
Conchita Wurst ("Rise like a Phoenix")
J Balvin ("Machika" and "Mi gente")
Guest judges (along with Manuel Martos): 
Víctor Escudero
Luísa Sobral
Julia Varela

Gala Especial: OT, la fiesta (13 February 2018) 
An extra special live show aired on 13 February 2018, with the audience's favourite performances of the five finalists, three group performances, and previously unaired moments of the contestants.

Tour
Following the finale, all 16 contestants reunited for a tour across arenas and stadiums in Spain, performing live to sell out audiences. A DVD+CD of the first concert of the tour in Barcelona was released in June 2018.

Notes

Ratings

References

External links
Operación Triunfo at RTVE.es

 
2017 Spanish television seasons
2018 Spanish television seasons
La 1 (Spanish TV channel) original programming